The Triumph Tiger Explorer (marketed as Triumph Tiger 1200 since November 2017) is a dual-sport motorcycle that was announced by British company Triumph Motorcycles at the EICMA show in November 2011. There are currently two model series available; the Tiger 1200 GT and Tiger 1200 Rally. Both models have similar specifications, but the Rally series comes with a set-up that is geared toward off-road riding with spoked wheels instead of the aluminum cast wheels found on the GT series.
They are both powered by a   straight-three engine with four valves per cylinder and a six-speed gearbox with shaft final drive.

References

External links
Triumph Tiger Explorer microsite
Triumph Tiger Explorer at Triumph Motorcycles UK

Unofficial owners Forum

Tiger Explorer
Shaft drive motorcycles
Dual-sport motorcycles
Motorcycles introduced in 2012